A Vijay Music Award is an accolade given by Vijay TV to recognize outstanding achievement in the Tamil music industry. The annual awards ceremony made its debut in 2011 for the previous calendar year. It launched its official website in partnership with Galatta.com. Its main sponsor was India Gate Basmati Rice and it was powered by The Chennai Silks. Media partners were the publications The Hindu and Kumudam.

The first award ceremony took place in Nehru Indoor Stadium on 11 May 2011. The ceremony was broadcast by Vijay TV in two parts on the 26 and 27 May 2011.

Ceremonies

Award categories 
Award were given in 25 categories, chosen by a jury appointed by Vijay TV and the public.

Jury Awards 
The list of winners 2010:

Best Male Singer

Best Female Singer

Best Music Director

Best Lyricist

Best Folk Song

Best Lyricist with the Maximum Hits in a Year

Best Singer with the Maximum Hits in a Year

Best Song Sung by a Music Director

Best Debut Singer

Best Debut Music Director

Best Western Song

Best Sound Mixing

Best Song by an Actor

Honoring The Legends

Lifetime Achievement Award

Isai Assangal

Global Indian

Isai Chakravarthi

Evergreen Voice

Popular awards 
The winners are selected by the people by SMS voting, online voting, voting at various stalls opened by the channel, and with a bus to collect votes at various cities, called the Rasigan Express. The award's online partner also enabled online voting for the popular category. Several award that had been announced were not awarded. The list of 2010 winners:

Popular Singer Female

Popular Singer Male

Popular Album of the Year

Popular Song of the Year

Popular Song of the Masses

Popular Duet of the Year

Popular Melody of the Year

Mirchi Listeners Choice Award for Best Song

See also 
 Vijay Awards
 Tamil cinema
 Cinema of India

References

External links 
 

|}

Awards established in 2011
Indian music awards